Millburne is an unincorporated community along the Blacks Fork river in central Uinta County, Wyoming, United States.

History
In the mid-1800s, a Mormon supply station was located near Millburne. In 1914, prominent educator James W. Fisher moved to Millburne and taught school there. In the 1930 Census, the population of the Millburne district was 149. It rose to 160 by the 1940 census.

Geography
The roadway continues south from Millburne as Uinta County Road 260. The Blacks Fork river flows through Millburn, and its waters are of the calcium bicarbonate type, with good quality. The Blacks Fork River Lodge is located in Millburne.

See also

 List of unincorporated communities in Wyoming

References

Unincorporated communities in Wyoming
Populated places in Uinta County, Wyoming